King Island is part of the Great Barrier Reef Marine Park at the tip of Cape Melville, Queensland in Bathurst Bay.

It is northeast of Denham Island and Flinders Island in the Flinders Group National Park. King Island (Erobin) lies off the coast of Queensland.

See also

 List of islands of Australia

References

Islands on the Great Barrier Reef
Islands of Far North Queensland
Uninhabited islands of Australia
Protected areas of Far North Queensland